The Forgotten is a Ukrainian-Swiss co-production drama directed by Daria Onishchenko in 2019. The film tells the story of a thirty-year-old Ukrainian language teacher, Nina, who lives in Luhansk, occupied during the Russian-Ukrainian war, and who, due to the ban on the Ukrainian language by the Russian occupation authorities, is forced to retrain from a Ukrainian language teacher to a Russian language teacher, and at the same time struggle with internal experiences and feelings due to a sudden outbreak of love between her and a local seventeen-year-old boy.

The world premiere of the film took place on October 12, 2019, at the 35th Warsaw Film Festival as part of the competition program "1-2" ("Competition of the first and second feature films of young directors"), where the film received a special mention from the jury. The film was presented in Ukraine on August 22, 2020, as part of the non-competitive program of the 49th Kyiv International Film Festival "Molodist". The film was released in Ukrainian limited rental on September 3, 2020, and is distributed by Arthouse traffic.

See also
Russo-Ukrainian War
War in Donbas
Cinema of Ukraine

References

External links 
 
 The Forgotten at SwissFilms
 Directory Films profile

2019 films
Swiss drama films
War in Donbas films
Ukrainian drama films